Broadcast News is a 1987 American romantic comedy-drama film written, produced and directed by James L. Brooks. The film concerns a virtuoso television news producer (Holly Hunter) who has daily emotional breakdowns, a brilliant yet prickly reporter (Albert Brooks), and the latter's charismatic but far less seasoned rival (William Hurt). It also stars Robert Prosky, Lois Chiles, Joan Cusack, and Jack Nicholson.

The film was acclaimed by critics and at the 60th Academy Awards received seven nominations, including Best Picture. In 2018, the film was selected for preservation in the United States National Film Registry by the Library of Congress as being "culturally, historically, or aesthetically significant."

Plot
Jane Craig is a talented but intense news producer whose life revolves around her work. She is passionate about reporting, and abhors the trend towards soft news in news broadcasts. Her best friend and collaborator, Aaron Altman, is a gifted writer and reporter, but is lacking in many social skills. The two work in the Washington, D.C. bureau of a national TV network. The bureau hires Tom Grunick, a local news anchorman who started his career in sports. Tom is tall, handsome, likable, and telegenic, but lacks news experience and isn't especially bright. He constantly seeks help from Jane to assist him with his reporting, who resents his lack of qualifications, but finds herself attracted to him. Tom is also attracted to Jane, but is intimidated by her skills and intensity.

Aaron and Jane go to Nicaragua to report on the Sandinista rebels there and get caught up in a shooting battle between them and the contras but remain unscathed and bring home footage that wins the approval of their national anchorman. At an office party, news arrives of a Libyan plane having bombed a U.S. military base in Italy. The network chief decides to put on a special report on the spot, with Tom as anchor and Jane as executive producer. Aaron, who is at the party and has extensive knowledge about the subject, is devastated at Tom's selection. Jane argues that Tom lacks the skills to handle the responsibility of the report, but is overruled by the network chief. Watching from his home, Aaron calls Jane with pertinent information, which she feeds to Tom through his earpiece. With the combination of Tom's on-camera poise and Jane's hard news skills, the report is a great success. Their teamwork also intensifies their mutual attraction.  When Jane returns for drinks with colleagues later in the evening, she meets Tom as he is leaving with co-worker Jennifer. Jane later selects Jennifer for an extended assignment in Alaska so that Tom and Jennifer will not be able to pursue a relationship with each other.

Wanting to complete a story without outside assistance, Tom creates a piece on date rape; the piece includes an extended interview with a rape victim, where Tom is shown tearing up in reaction to her story. Aaron and Jane are unimpressed with the story, but Jane finds it affecting nonetheless. In the face of potential layoffs, Aaron receives an opportunity to anchor the weekend news due to most of his colleagues going to the White House Correspondents' Dinner. He seeks advice from Tom, who encourages Aaron to be more salesman-like in his approach. Aaron writes high-quality copy and takes Tom's advice, but during the broadcast begins sweating uncontrollably, resulting in a disastrous broadcast. Meanwhile, Jane and Tom begin to progress romantically at the White House Correspondents' Dinner.  But before things get more involved, Jane leaves to console Aaron. The two have a heated argument, where Aaron tells Jane that Tom represents everything Jane hates about the direction of news media.  Aaron also tells Jane that he is in love with her.

The forewarned layoffs hit the network, resulting in many colleagues losing their jobs. Tom is moved to the London office, indicating that he is being groomed for a national anchor position; Jane is promoted to bureau chief. Tom and Jane agree to take a romantic getaway together before starting their new jobs. Aaron tenders his resignation and tells Jane he plans to take a job at a local television station in Portland, Oregon. Before he leaves, he tells Jane that Tom's tears during his date rape piece were staged; reviewing the footage, Jane realizes that Aaron is correct. Jane angrily confronts him at the airport, saying that his actions were a breach of journalistic ethics and that she cannot in good conscience become personally involved with him. Tom argues with her, but eventually relents, leaving Jane behind.

The three meet again seven years later. Tom has taken over as national anchorman, Aaron has a wife and child, and Jane has a new boyfriend. Jane reveals she plans to take a managing editor role for the network in New York, working with Tom again. Tom leaves after Jane declines a dinner invitation with him and his fiancée, while she and Aaron sit on a bench and catch up on their respective lives.

Cast

Production
The score was by Bill Conti. Emmy Award-winning composers Glen Roven and Marc Shaiman make cameo appearances as a dorky musician team who have composed a theme for the news program in the film.

The character of Jane Craig was based on journalist and news producer Susan Zirinsky. She served as associate producer and technical advisor for the film. The female lead was originally written for Debra Winger, who worked with James L. Brooks in Terms of Endearment. However, Winger became pregnant and was replaced by Holly Hunter just two days before filming began. Sigourney Weaver, Dianne Wiest, Jessica Lange, Elizabeth Perkins, and Mary Beth Hurt were also considered for the role. Brooks originally wrote the role of Aaron Altman specifically for his longtime friend Albert Brooks in mind. Principal photography began in Washington, D.C. in February 2, 1986, officially wrapping in April 1987 after filming several scenes in Florida.

Reception

Box office
Broadcast News was given a limited release  on December 16, 1987, in seven theaters and managed to gross USD $197,542 on its opening weekend. It went into wide release in the United States on December 25, 1987, in 677 theaters, grossing $5.5 million on its opening weekend. The film went on to make $51.3 million in North America and $16.1 million in the rest of the world for a worldwide total of $67.3 million.

Critical response
Film critic Roger Ebert of the Chicago Sun-Times gave the film four out of four stars and praised the film for being as "knowledgeable about the TV news-gathering process as any movie ever made, but it also has insights into the more personal matter of how people use high-pressure jobs as a way of avoiding time alone with themselves". In his review for The New York Times, Vincent Canby wrote, "As the fast-talking Aaron, Albert Brooks comes very close to stealing Broadcast News. Mr. Brooks ... is more or less the conscience of Broadcast News". Jonathan Rosenbaum, in his review for the Chicago Reader, praised Holly Hunter's performance as "something of a revelation: her short, feisty, socially gauche, aggressive-compulsive character may be the most intricately layered portrait of a career woman that contemporary Hollywood has given us".

Hal Hinson, in his review for The Washington Post, wrote, "[James] Brooks is excellent at taking us inside the world of television, but not terribly good at analyzing it. He has a facile, too-pat approach to dealing with issues; there's still too much of the sitcom mentality at work". In his review for Time, Richard Corliss praised William Hurt's performance: "Hurt is neat too, never standing safely outside his character, always allowing Tom to find the humor in his too-rapid success, locating a dimness behind his eyes when Tom is asked a tough question -- and for Tom, poor soulless sensation-to-be, all questions are tough ones". The magazine also ranked Broadcast News as one of the best films of the year. The film garnered a 98% rating at Rotten Tomatoes from 52 critics. The site's consensus states: "Blockbuster dramatist James L. Brooks delivers with Broadcast News, fully entertaining with deft, deep characterization." The film has an 84/100 average score at Metacritic, based on 16 reviews, indicating "universal acclaim".

Broadcast News was placed on 61 "ten-best" lists, making it the most acclaimed film of 1987.

Accolades

Also, the film is recognized by American Film Institute in these lists:
 1998: AFI's 100 Years...100 Movies – Nominated
 2000: AFI's 100 Years...100 Laughs – #64
 2005: AFI's 100 Years...100 Movie Quotes:
 Aaron Altman: "I'll meet you at the place near the thing where we went that time." – Nominated
 2007: AFI's 100 Years...100 Movies (10th Anniversary Edition) – Nominated

Home media
A digitally restored version of the film was released on DVD and Blu-ray by The Criterion Collection. The release includes new audio commentary featuring Brooks and Marks, James L. Brooks—A Singular Voice, a documentary on Brooks's career in television and film, an alternative ending and deleted scenes with commentary by Brooks, an interview with veteran CBS news producer Susan Zirinsky, and a featurette containing on-set footage and interviews with Brooks, Hunter, and actor Albert Brooks. There is also a booklet featuring an essay by film critic Carrie Rickey.

References

External links

 
 
 
 
 
 Broadcast News at The Numbers
 Broadcast News: Lines and Deadlines an essay by Carrie Rickey at the Criterion Collection

1987 films
1980s romantic comedy-drama films
1980s satirical films
American romantic comedy-drama films
American satirical films
Films about journalists
Films about television
Films directed by James L. Brooks
Films produced by James L. Brooks
Films scored by Bill Conti
Films set in Nicaragua
Films set in the 1960s
Films set in the 1980s
Films set in the 1990s
Films set in Washington, D.C.
Films shot in Maryland
Films shot in Virginia
Films shot in Washington, D.C.
Gracie Films films
Films with screenplays by James L. Brooks
United States National Film Registry films
1987 comedy films
1987 drama films
20th Century Fox films
1980s English-language films
1980s American films